Josefina, officially the Municipality of Josefina (Subanen: Benwa Josefina; Chavacano: Municipalidad de Josefina), is a 5th class municipality in the province of Zamboanga del Sur, Philippines. According to the 2020 census, it has a population of 12,205 people.

History
In the early years the lands of which is now Josefina was part of the Municipality of Aurora. In later years, Molave separated from Aurora and became a town; at that time Tambulig and the area now within the jurisdiction of the present municipality were still part of the former. Some years later Tambulig became independent and was recognized as a township with the land of Josefina still tagged as part of its territories. During this time the first Visayan settlers came to live in the area. These settlers came from Tudela, Misamis Occidental, a barrio part of Tambulig was established and was named Bagong Tudela.

Some years passed and the Paredes family, one of the first settlers, was able to acquire properties there and named it "Salug Estate". A member of the family was a rubber technologist at that time and worked in Borneo. He brought along his lessons and expertise and together with the locals, "the Subanen", planted his land with Rubber Trees. By then the Rubber Technologist, Nicholas Paredes, coined the name "New Town" for the new rubber plantation.

With the rubber plantation, the place was then locally called as "Gumahan". This became a new trading center and small businesses came bustling. With the increased activity in this new location it was then christened as "Upper Bagong Tudela". This eventually became the center of the new community.

In the early 1970s, the people of Gumahan and its outlying barrios made a move, through the leadership of Nicholas Paredes, to create a town. They were able to submit the proposal to congress, through the sponsorship of then Cong. Cerilles, and it passed the 2nd congressional reading. When scheduled for the 3rd and final congressional reading, Martial Law was declared dissolving the Congress.

On November 11, 1978, by virtue of Presidential Decree 1240, 13 barangays of Tambulig were separated and formed into the independent municipality Josefina. During this time Nicholas Paredes (who was the point person of the township proposal) stood as the first Mayor (appointed). Mayor Paredes donated the land where now stands the Market Area, the school, the Municipal Hall and the Catholic Church. The town center is also located within the properties of the Paredes family.

Josefina was named after the mother of Congressman Cerilles, who was a known educator in Zamboanga Del Sur.

As to this day Josefina is still commonly known as "Gumahan".

Geography

Barangays
Josefina is politically subdivided into 14 barangays.

Climate

Demographics

Economy

References

External links
 Josefina Profile at PhilAtlas.com
 [ Philippine Standard Geographic Code]
Philippine Census Information

Municipalities of Zamboanga del Sur
Establishments by Philippine presidential decree